AD 58 (LVIII) was a common year starting on Sunday (link will display the full calendar) of the Julian calendar. At the time, it was known as the Year of the Consulship of Caesar and Messalla (or, less frequently, year 811 Ab urbe condita). The denomination AD 58 for this year has been used since the early medieval period, when the Anno Domini calendar era became the prevalent method in Europe for naming years.

Events

By place

Roman Empire 
 Emperor Nero and Marcus Valerius Messalla Corvinus become Roman consuls.
 The friendship between Nero and Marcus Salvius Otho ends when they both fall in love with Poppea Sabina, and Otho is sent to Lusitania as governor.
 Agrippina the Younger is expelled from the imperial palace by her son Nero, who installs her in Villa Antonia in Misenum, and leaving more of the effective and real power of Empire in the hands of Nero.
 Roman-Parthian War: Gnaeus Domitius Corbulo, commander in the East, launches his Armenian offensive against Parthia. He leads a Roman army (four legions) through the mountainous country of Armenia, against the fortress at Volandum, to the southwest of Artaxata. After a siege of eight hours Corbulo takes the city; the legionnaires massacre the defenders and plunder Volandum to their hearts' content.
 Corbulo marches to Artaxata crossing the Aras River; along the valley he is shadowed by tens of thousands of mounted Parthian archers led by king Tiridates I. The city opens its gates to Corbulo, just as it had to Germanicus four decades before. When he takes the 250-year-old Armenian capital, Corbulo gives the residents a few hours to collect their valuables and burns the city to the ground.
 The Ficus Ruminalis begins to die (see Rumina).
 Agrippina the Younger, conspired with the senators in late 58 to overthrow Nero.
 Gnaeus Julius Agricola, 18 years old, is serving as a military tribune in Britain under Gaius Suetonius Paulinus and is attached to Legio II Augusta.

Europe 
 In Thuringia conflict between two Germanic tribes erupts over access to water.
 Romans learn the use of soap from the Gauls (approximate date).

Asia 
 Emperor Ming of Han introduces Buddhism to China inviting monks from the western Indus Valley.
 In China, sacrifices to Confucius are ordered in all government schools.
 Start of Yongping era of the Chinese Han Dynasty.

By topic

Religion 
 The apostle Paul returns to Jerusalem with the money he has collected to give the Christian community there. However, he is accused of defiling the temple, and is arrested and imprisoned in Caesarea. He then invokes his Roman citizenship and is sent to Rome to be judged.
 Paul writes his Epistle to the Romans (approximate date).

Births 
 Juvenal, Roman poet and writer (approximate date)
 Xu Shen, Chinese politician and writer (approximate date)

Deaths 
 Deng Yu, Chinese general of Han Dynasty (b. AD 2)
 Geng Yan, Chinese general of the Han Dynasty (b. AD 3)
 Pharasmanes I, Roman client king of Iberia
 Rhadamistus, Roman client king of Armenia

References 

0058